Tomek Wilmowski is a series of nine  youth adventure novels written by Polish author Alfred Szklarski. The series was published from 1957 to 1994.

The title character, young traveler Tomek Wilmowski is the main protagonist of the novels. The books are stories about his adventures in different countries of the world. They are set in the beginning of 20th century. The other characters of the novels are Tomek's father Andrzej Wilmowski (geographer), sailor and comic relief of books Tadeusz Nowicki, mysterious traveller and animal hunter Jan Smuga, Australian friend and later Tomek's wife Sally Allan, his cousin Zbigniew Karski and his Russian wife Natasha. Tomek and his friends are Polish emigrants who must flee from the country under Russian occupation.

The books contain much geographical, historical, cultural and biological knowledge as well as humour and entertainment which is aimed at adolescents and young adults.

The series 

1. Tomek in the land of the kangaroos (Tomek w krainie kangurów), 1957 
 First adventure of Tomek in Australia.
2. Tomek on the Black Continent (Tomek na Czarnym Lądzie), 1958
 Tomek and his friends travel to Kenya and Uganda, where the heroes want to catch wild animals for a zoological garden.
3. Tomek on the warpath (Tomek na wojennej ścieżce), 1959 
 Vacation of Tomek in the United States, where his friend Sally is staying and where she was kidnapped by Native Americans.
4. Tomek traces the Yeti (Tomek na tropach Yeti), 1961 
 Tomek and his father and friend are seeking the traveller Jan Smuga, who was lost in Tibet.
5. Tomek's secret expedition (Tajemnicza wyprawa Tomka), 1963 
 Tomek and his friend save Tomek's cousin, Zbigniew from Russian captivity.
6. Tomek among the headhunters (Tomek wśród łowców głów), 1965 
 Tomek and his friends travel to Papua New Guinea.
7. Tomek at the source of the Amazon (Tomek u źródeł Amazonki), 1967 
 Tomek and his friends save Jan Smuga, who is being held captive by an indigenous tribe in Brazil and chase the murderers of the owner of a plantation.
8. Tomek in Gran Chaco (Tomek w Gran Chaco), 1987 
 Tomek's further adventures in South America.
9. Tomek in the Pharaohs' tombs (Tomek w grobowcach faraonów), 1994 
 Tomek and his friends travel to Egypt.

References 

Young adult novels
Polish novels
20th-century Polish novels
Polish children's novels
Series of children's books